Kamil Susko (born 6 November 1974) is a retired Slovak football goalkeeper.

Susko made 16 appearances for the Slovakia national football team in 1999 and 2000.

References

External links
 

1974 births
Living people
Slovak footballers
Slovakia international footballers
Sepahan S.C. footballers
PAOK FC players
Expatriate footballers in the Czech Republic
Expatriate footballers in Iran
Expatriate footballers in Austria
FK Inter Bratislava players
FC Spartak Trnava players
FC Baník Ostrava players
Sportspeople from Trenčín
Kapfenberger SV players
Slovak Super Liga players
Slovak expatriate sportspeople in Austria
Slovak expatriate sportspeople in Iran
Expatriate footballers in Greece
Association football goalkeepers
Slovak expatriate sportspeople in Greece
Slovak expatriate sportspeople in the Czech Republic